Arne Andersen (born February 7, 1944) is a former Danish handball player who competed in the 1972 Summer Olympics.

He played his club handball with Efterslægten, and was the top goalscorer of the club in the 1972 Danish Handball League. In 1972 he was part of the Denmark men's national handball team which finished thirteenth in the Olympic tournament. He played all five matches and scored three goals.

References

1944 births
Living people
Danish male handball players
Olympic handball players of Denmark
Handball players at the 1972 Summer Olympics